Simon González (born 21 September 1936) is a Puerto Rican former sports shooter. He competed in the 25 metre pistol event at the 1972 Summer Olympics.

References

1936 births
Living people
Puerto Rican male sport shooters
Olympic shooters of Puerto Rico
Shooters at the 1972 Summer Olympics
Place of birth missing (living people)